Cche or Double Che (Ꚇ ꚇ; italics: Ꚇ ꚇ) is a letter of the Cyrillic script. It was used in the old Abkhaz alphabets, where it represents the voiceless retroflex affricate . The letter was invented by baron Peter von Uslar. In 1862 he published his linguistic study "Абхазский язык". The letter is Ҽ-shaped but in 1887 Uslar's study was reprinted by M. Zavadskiy who changed its shape and the result resembled a Cyrillic Ч doubled. Later the letter returned to its initial form which, created by linguist Uslar, is part of modern Abkhaz alphabet, which is depicted as Ҽ.

Computing codes

Related characters and other similar characters
 Պ պ : Armenian letter Pe
 ɰ : Voiced velar approximant
 Ч ч : Cyrillic letter Che
 Һ һ : Cyrillic letter Shha
 Ꮒ : Cherokee letter Ni

References